Christopher Crapper (5 July 1884 – 1933) was an English professional footballer who played as a full-back. He played in the Football League for The Wednesday and Grimsby Town. After football he became a prominent member of South Kirkby Parish Council, Hemsworth Rural Council and died in South Elmsall in June 1933.

Playing career
Crapper began his career at South Kirkby, joining Sheffield Wednesday in May 1905. In July 1907 he left the Owls, signing for Grimsby Town. His career at Grimsby was halted by a broken leg and he returned to his first club South Kirkby.

References

1884 births
1933 deaths
People from Rotherham
English footballers
Association football fullbacks
Sheffield Wednesday F.C. players
Grimsby Town F.C. players
South Kirkby Colliery F.C. players
English Football League players